Anjelina Nadai Lohalith (born 1993, credited as January 1) is a track and field athlete originally from South Sudan, but now living and training in Kenya. She competed as part of the Refugee Olympic Team at the 2016 Summer Olympics.

Early life 
Lohalith was born in South Sudan. She and her family slept in the brush to avoid being found during raids. In 2001 when Lohalith was eight years old she had to leave her home when her country was gripped by civil war and violence closed in on her village with landmines being found near her home. She was separated from her parents as her parents sent her to Kenya for safety. She arrived in northern Kenya in 2002, settling in the Kakuma refugee camp. The Kakuma refugee camp is one of the largest refugee camps in the world with over 179,000 people. While attending primary school in the camp she took up running.

Career 
Despite winning various school competitions, it was only when professional coaches came to Kakuma to hold selection trials for a special training camp, that she discovered just how good she was. Lohalith was selected to train under Olympic champion marathon runner Tegla Loroupe at her sports foundation in Nairobi. Here, the 1500m runner trains with four other runners from South Sudan who will participate in the Olympic refugee team at Rio 2016. who has been selected by the International Olympic Committee (IOC) to compete for the Refugee Olympic Team in the women's 1500 m at the 2016 Summer Olympics in Rio de Janeiro, Brazil. Lohalith placed 40th out of 41 runners in Round 1 of the event with a time of 4:47.38. She did not advance.

Lohalith hopes that through her success in running she will be able to help her parents who she has not seen since she was 8 years old.

Competitions

References

External links

 Article about Lohalith

South Sudanese refugees
Place of birth missing (living people)
Athletes (track and field) at the 2016 Summer Olympics
Athletes (track and field) at the 2020 Summer Olympics
Refugee Olympic Team at the 2016 Summer Olympics
Refugee Olympic Team at the 2020 Summer Olympics
South Sudanese expatriate sportspeople in Kenya
1993 births
Living people
South Sudanese female middle-distance runners
Athlete Refugee Team at the World Athletics Championships